Senator Haralson may refer to:

Hugh A. Haralson (1805–1854), Georgia State Senate
Jeremiah Haralson (1846–1916), Alabama State Senate